Lee Sun-hee is a Korean name consisting of the family name Lee and the given name Sun-hee, and may also refer to:

 Lee Sun-hee (baseball) (born 1955), South Korean baseball player
 Lee Sun-hee (singer) (born 1964), South Korean singer
 Lee Sun-hee (taekwondo) (born 1978), South Korean taekwondo practitioner